is a Tokyo Kyuko Electric Railway Tamagawa Line station located in Ōta, Tokyo.

Station layout
Two ground-level side platforms.

History
 February 29, 1924 Opened as 鵜ノ木駅(unoki eki) of Meguro-Kamata Electric Railway Mekama line.
 November 16, 1939 Became a station of Tokyo-Yokohama Electric Railway by merging.
 May 26, 1942 Became a station of Tokyo Kyuko Electric Railway by merging.
 January 20, 1966 Renamed to the present name.
 August 6, 2000 Became a station of Tokyu Tamagawa Line by division of Tokyu Mekama Line.

References 

Railway stations in Tokyo
Railway stations in Japan opened in 1924
Tokyu Tamagawa Line
Stations of Tokyu Corporation